Peters' duiker (Cephalophus callipygus) is a small antelope found in Gabon, Equatorial Guinea, southern Cameroon, and northern Republic of the Congo.

Peters' duikers typically weigh about 40 lb (18 kg), and are about 20 in (50 cm) at the shoulder. They have grey-brown coats, and live in dense undergrowth in mountain rainforests. The total population is estimated at 380,000 individuals, with a declining trend.

References

External links

Peters' duiker
Mammals of Central Africa
Mammals of Cameroon
Mammals of Equatorial Guinea
Mammals of Gabon
Mammals of the Republic of the Congo
Peters's duiker
Peters's duiker